Jaitley or Jaitly/Jetley is a Brahmin clan, originally from the Pir Panjal Region of Jammu and Kashmir, India, but are also found in Amritsar, Lahore, Rawalpindi and other areas of erstwhile Punjab, in northern India. Jaitleys are part of Punjabi Saraswat Brahmins of Punjab region. Mostly the gotra of Jaitley is Vatsa gotra from the sage Brahmarishi Bhrigu sections of gotra.

There are several other ways of spelling the name, including Jaiteley, Jaitli, Jetly, Jatley and Jetli.

The early 20th century book by H. A. Rose, A Glossary of the Tribes and Castes of the Punjab and North-West Frontier Province, summarized the variety of families and tribes of Vedic origin at the time. The late 19th century book by Jogendra N. Bhattacharya, "Hindu Castes and Sects" also gives the historical details of this Brahmin family.
Jaitly family history shows they have also remained as great astrologers . their family tree has traces of pandit Billu Mishr and Pandit Chittu Mishr of serving in the court room of Maharaja Ranjeet singh . This family of astrologers has a great continuing legacy till date and are based in Delhi .

Notable people

Jaitley
 Arun Jaitley, Indian politician

Jaitly
Celina Jaitly, Bollywood actress and model
Jaya Jaitly, Indian politician

Jetley
 Ranjit Lal Jetley, Indian major-general and scientist
 Rajan Jetley, chief executive officer of Air India and India Tourism Development Corporation

References

Social groups of India
Indian surnames
Social groups of Jammu and Kashmir
Punjabi Brahmins
Punjabi tribes
Punjabi-language surnames
Brahmin communities
Surnames
Hindu surnames